Shannon C. Stimson (born October 8, 1951) is an American political theorist and historian of ideas, whose more recent work and teaching spans the economic and political thought of the early modern period through the nineteenth century.  She is the Thomas and Dorothy Leavey Chair in the Government department at Georgetown University. Her academic posts have included appointments at Harvard University (1984-1991), UC Berkeley (1991-2014), the Fulbright Professorship in the United Kingdom, the Christensen Fellowship of St. Catherine's College, Oxford, the John K. Castle Chair in Ethics, Politics and Economics at Yale University and she has been a Distinguished Academic Visitor at Queens' College, Cambridge on two occasions. Her research has been supported through fellowships from the Mellon Foundation, the National Endowment for the Humanities, the American Association of University Women, as well as by several prize fellowships. Her articles have appeared in numerous edited volumes, journals of political thought, economics, the history of economic thought, and political science in America and Europe. She has served on the editorial boards of the American Political Science Review, the Adam Smith Review, and the Journal of Politics.

Research 
Stimson's early work focused on the intersection of legal, constitutional, and revolutionary thought in 17th and 18th century Anglo-America.  Her work focused on the study of both English and colonial juries in revolutionary periods and introduced to political theory the concept of "judicial space" as an incisive tool for organizing, interpreting, and evaluating various strands of English and American political thought, and for challenging the assumption of a basic unity of vision at the roots of Anglo-American jurisprudence.  She introduced the judicial space concept to political theory in order to account for the development of the highly political role of the new Supreme Court in late 18th-century and early 19th-century American political thought, a judicial body having no clear, previous counterpart in English jurisprudence.

Stimson's work in the history and theory of political economy has focused on the intersection and mutual interplay of economic and political theorizing and debate in the writing of the classical political economists after Adam Smith.  This work, undertaken together with Cambridge economist Murray Milgate, has emphasized one set of conceptual transformations in politics and political economy that took place during a part of what has been called the classical period of political economy, and directly challenged the casual association of Smith's name and ideological imprimatur with contemporary neoclassical and neoconservative economic arguments for the reestablishment of an "invisible hand" as the prime regulator of complex national and globalized markets, as well as the unsubstantiated belief in a putatively Smithian inspired version of perfect competition to promote efficiency in the allocation of resources such that all would be fully utilized to the greatest social and individual benefit. The importance of her work on this topic has been recognized in 2011 with its receipt of the David and Elaine Spitz Prize from the International Conference for the Study of Political Thought. This international award, honoring the best book in liberal and/or democratic theory published in the previous two years, has in the past honored as well the work of political thinkers and philosophers such as John Rawls, Sheldon Wolin, Martha Nussbaum, Robert Dahl, and Joseph Raz.

Selected bibliography

Books 
 
Reprinted in 2014 as:

Chapters in books

Edited volumes 
 
 
Reviewed in

Journal articles

Book reviews

References

External links

1951 births
Living people
American political philosophers
Harvard University alumni
Harvard University faculty
University of California, Berkeley faculty